Sky Krimi is a German television channel dedicated to crime series. It mostly features original German language productions.

It started out as "Krimi & Co" on the DF1 satellite platform when it launched. DF1 had several channels dedicated to television series, including soap channel Herz & Co and comedy channel Comedy & Co. When DF1 became Premiere World in October 1999, the sister channels were rebranded.

In May 2002, Krimi & Co was renamed "Premiere Krimi". On 4 July 2009, the channel became "Sky Krimi" and was moved back to the entertainment package from the film package.

On 1 April 2021, Sky Deutschland will launch a local version of crime factual channel Sky Crime; this will coexist with the fiction-led Sky Krimi, in the same way that the British version of Sky Crime exists alongside fiction-led Sky Witness.

Programming

100 Code (2015)
Bella Block (2004–present)
Blochin (2016–present)
Bordertown (2017)
Cologne P.D. (2004–present)
Dengler (2017–present)
Der Bulle von Tölz (1999–2006, 2015–present)
Der Kapitän (2004–2006, 2008–present)
Der letzte Bulle (2017–present)
Der letzte Zeuge (2001–present)
Dicte (2016–present)
Die Brücke
Die Kumpel (2016–present)
Die Rosenheim-Cops
Dresden Mord (2017–present)
Edel & Starck (2016–2017)
Ein Fall für Zwei
Ein Mord für Quandt (1998, 2001–2004, 2016–present)
Ein starkes Team
Flemming (2011–present)
Friesland (2016–present)
Helen Dorn (2017–present)
HeliCops – Einsatz über Berlin (2001–2004, 2016–present)
Ihr Auftrag, Pater Castell (2011–present)
Inspektor Rolle (2017–present)
Jake und McCabe
KDD – Kriminaldauerdienst
Kommissar Marthaler (2017–present)
Küstenwache (2001–present)
Leipzig Homicide (2002–present)
Letzte Spur Berlin (2013–present)
Kommissar Beck
Matlock (2009–2010)
Notruf Hafenkante (2012–present)
The Old Fox
R. I. S. – Die Sprache der Toten (2016–present)
Siska (2001–present)
SK Kölsch (2001–2006, 2015–present)
SOKO 5113
SOKO Rhein-Main (2008–present)
SOKO Wismar (2005–present)
The Fall (The Fall – Tod in Belfast) (2016–present)
Tod eines Mädchens (2016–present)
Wolffs Revier (1997–2006, 2016–present)

See also
 Sky Crime, a shorter running crime-themed British television channel equivalent also operated by Sky plc as a part of UK portfolio.

References

See also
 Sky Witness (TV channel), a crime-themed British television channel operated by Sky plc as a part of its UK and Ireland portfolio, relaunched from Sky Living on 6 August 2018.
 Sky Crime, another crime-themed British television channel operated by Sky plc, that launched on 1 October 2019.

External links
 Sky Krimi on sky.de 

Sky Deutschland
Sky television channels
Television channels and stations established in 1996
Television stations in Germany
Television stations in Austria
German-language television stations